Mount Lebanon Chapel and Cemetery, also known as Lebanon Chapel, is a historic Episcopal chapel and cemetery located on the grounds of Airlie Gardens in Wilmington, New Hanover County, North Carolina. It was built about 1835, and is a one-story, three bay by three bay, gable-roofed, rectangular building in a vernacular Greco-Gothic.  It measures 26 feet wide and 37 feet deep, and is sheathed in weatherboard.  It was restored in 1974. The cemetery contains 138 burials dating from 1815 to 2016.  It is the oldest known surviving church in New Hanover County.

It was listed on the National Register of Historic Places in 1986.

References

Episcopal church buildings in North Carolina
Cemeteries in North Carolina
Chapels in the United States
Churches on the National Register of Historic Places in North Carolina
Greek Revival church buildings in North Carolina
Gothic Revival church buildings in North Carolina
Churches completed in 1835
Churches in New Hanover County, North Carolina
19th-century Episcopal church buildings
National Register of Historic Places in New Hanover County, North Carolina